Hasmik is an Armenian feminine given name. It may refer to:

 Hasmik Harutyunyan (born 1960), Armenian folk singer
 Hasmik Karapetyan (born 1977), Armenian pop singer
 Hasmik Papian (born 1961), Armenian soprano
 Hasmik Poghosyan (born 1960), Armenian politician, Armenian Minister of Culture (2006–2016)
 Hasmik (actress), stage name of Armenian actress Taguhi Hakobyan (1878–1947)

References 

Armenian feminine given names